Steve Johnson is an English film director.

Life and career
Steve Johnson was born in Liverpool in England. At school, Johnson was a keen middle distance runner and set a Great Britain record for his age group in the 4x1,500 metre relay. He took part in a student exchange programme which allowed him to study in Michigan in the United States. During his time here, he became Michigan State Cross Country Champion and participated in many running events including the Athletic Congress national cross country meet at Purdue University and the Invitational Cross Country meet at Bullock Creek.

Johnson's love for film first began after seeing Star Wars at the Futurist Theatre in Liverpool. In November 2005, Johnson established Futurist Online Ltd (later becoming Futurist Digital Ltd in 2013) in Glasgow, Scotland. Over the years, Johnson developed his skills on the Red Digital Cinema Camera Company camera system and later became a freelance trainer and course producer for their REDucation courses and has taught in many cities across the globe including Brisbane, Berlin, Dubai, London, Los Angeles, Madrid, Moscow, Oslo and Singapore. He has also held classes at Pinewood Studios and YouTube Space, London.

In 2014, Futurist Digital teamed up with Production Attic and Quick Off The Mark Productions to film and produce three short children's films for a competition run by Vue Cinemas. The competition asked school children from Aultmore Park Primary School to draw a short storyboard for a film with the top three concepts being made into real short films and shown at their local cinema.

The following year, Johnson served as a post production supervisor for the short film When The Tide Comes In which went on to receive a nomination for Best Composer at the 2015 British Academy Scotland New Talent Awards.

In 2015, Johnson launched an online crowd funding campaign to raise money for what would become his directorial debut and his first feature film project. The Students of Springfield Street follows twenty-four hours in the lives of six friends, examining interpersonal connections and the intricate weave of words, actions and emotions that unknowingly link and change the direction of their day. The crowd funding campaign for the film was successful and raise $6000 in just 4 weeks.

The film was released on 26 June 2015 and was warmly received by critics both at home and abroad. Film review website Indyred wrote: 

On 23 October 2015, the film had its UK Debut at the Aberdeen Film Festival. The film proved to be a hit with the festival's jurors who awarded the film the Best Feature award. Speaking about his win to Creative Clyde, Johnson said: 

Johnson released his second feature film, Convergence (2019 film) in 2019, premiering at Cineworld, Leicester Square, London as part of the 2019 British Independent Film Festival, where it won Best Feature Film and was nominated for a further four awards including Best Actor, Best Actress, Best Supporting Actor and Best Cinematography.
The film stars Jeremy Theobald and Nicolette McKeown.
'Convergence' played at numerous film festival around the world, also winning Best Feature Film at the 2019 Cardiff International Film Festival. The film has received numerous positive reviews: 

In 2021, Johnson directed his third feature film, the psychological thriller 'Stalker', written by Chris Watt and produced by production company Stronghold. The film stars bafta winning actor Stuart Brennan with cinematography by Blue Story Simon Stolland. In 2022, 'Stalker' had its World Premiere in Leicester Square, London, as part of Frightfest 2022 and will be distributed in the UK on DVD and Digital from Kaleidoscope Film Distribution. 'Stalker' received numerous 4* reviews.

Filmography

Awards and nominations

References

External links

Steve Johnson Official Website
Futurist Digital Website
Futuristfilm Website

Living people
1972 births
British film directors
English film directors
English screenwriters
English male screenwriters
English film producers
British film producers
Film people from Liverpool